Wands Historical Best Album is the second greatest hits album by Japanese pop-rock band Wands. It was released on 6 November 1997 under B-Gram Records label. This is album was released by new members of Wands. Album includes singles with vocalists Show Uesugi and Jiro Waku. Most of the tracks has received completely new arranged versions. The album reached #1 in its first week and sold 174,870 copies. The album charted for 11 weeks and sold more than 379,490 copies. This is last album which reached #1 in Oricon.

Track listing

References

1997 compilation albums
Wands (band) albums
Being Inc. compilation albums
Japanese-language compilation albums